Heart Beat Records, formed in 1985, is an independent record and video company concentrating on releases for and from the Catholic market and founded by a family of Irish-Americans.

History 
On October 1, 1994, HeartBeat moved to Donnellson, Iowa. Heartbeat was set up in 1985.

In the year 2000, Phillip Stein, Susan Stein, and Ronald Stein formed a 501(c)(3) non-profit organization. Phillip Stein, son of Susan Stein, was made  president of the association, for the first 5 years before stepping down but still remained on the board. The organization was called the United Catholic Music & Video Association and gave annual "Unity Awards" to various artists and producers of religious materials. 

In 2006 performer and founder member Dana Scallon and her husband Damien Scallon exited Heartbeat and formed their own music production company DS Music Productions. and in 2006 sought successfully, the return of the master recordings from Heartbeat Records. The recordings done under the HeartBeat's Label during Dana's time with them are published exclusively under DS Music.

Roster 
 Susanna (Susan Stein, co-founder of Heart Beat Records)
 Phillip K.(Phillip Stein, founding member and president of the United Catholic Music and Video Association and son of HeartBeat founders Ronald Stein and Susan Stein)

Discography 
Albums

References

External links 
HeartBeat Records
United Catholic Music and Video Association
Catholic Distribution – Largest on-line distributor of Catholic Music and Video

American independent record labels
Christian record labels
Record labels established in 1980